Tasasız Raziye Sultan ("carefree" and "acceptance, submission") was an Ottoman princess, the daughter of Ottoman Sultan Suleiman the Magnificent and an unknown concubine. She died in 1520 along with her half brothers Şehzade Mahmud and Şehzade Murad of an infectious disease, perhaps smallpox. She is buried at the Yahya Efendi's Tekke in Beşiktaş, Istanbul.

See also
Ottoman Empire
Ottoman dynasty
Ottoman family tree
List of sultans of the Ottoman Empire
Line of succession to the Ottoman throne
Ottoman family tree (simplified)

References

1522 deaths
Year of death uncertain
16th-century Ottoman princesses
Royalty and nobility who died as children